Ester Expósito Gayoso (born 26 January 2000) is a Spanish actress and model. She is best known for her starring role as Carla Rosón Caleruega in the Netflix teen drama series Élite.

Early life and acting career
Expósito was born on 26 January 2000 in Madrid. She became interested in the artistic world at a very young age. After completing her studies at the age of 16, she took acting courses. Expósito won Best Actress at the Madrid Theater Awards in 2013 and 2015. She first appeared on television as Rosa Martín in an episode of the docudrama series Centro Médico in 2016. Later that year, Expósito played Fernando's daughter in a season two episode of Vis a Vis on Antena 3. She reprised her role for a season three episode released in 2018. 

Expósito's first recurring television role was as Ruth in the first season of the TVE series, Estoy vivo, which aired in 2017. She then gained international fame for her role in the 2018 Netflix teen drama series Élite, in which she portrayed Carla Rosón Caleruega until 2020. After the success of the series, she starred in leading roles in the 2018 films Cuando los ángeles duermen as Silvia, and Tu hijo as Andrea, also distributed through Netflix. 

In 2019, Expósito appeared in the TVE series, La caza. Monteperdido, where she played Lucía Castán Grau, one of the disappeared girls. She then starred in the 2020 Netflix limited series Someone Has to Die, portraying Cayetana Aldama. Later that year, Expósito had a recurring role in the limited television series, Veneno, on Atresplayer Premium, playing Machús Osinaga, a journalist from the talk show Esta noche cruzamos el Mississippi. In December 2020, she appeared in the role of Claudia in the film Mamá o papá directed by Dani de la Orden, and starring Paco León and Miren Ibarguren. In 2021, she briefly returned to Élite, reprising her role as Carla in three short story episodes. 

Expósito will star in the upcoming horror film Venus in a "very physical" role.

Filmography

Film

Television

See also
List of Spanish actors

References

External links

 

2000 births
21st-century Spanish actresses
Actresses from Madrid
Living people
Spanish film actresses
Spanish stage actresses
Spanish television actresses
Web series actresses